Dorothy Bradford may refer to

 Dorothy Bradford (artist) (1918–2008), British painter 
 Dorothy Elizabeth Bradford (1897–1986), British painter 
 Dorothy Bradford (1597–1620), wife of William Bradford (Plymouth Colony governor)

See also  
 Bradford
 Bradford (name)